The Orne is a river in Grand Est, north-eastern France, which is a left tributary of the Moselle and sub-tributary of the Rhine. Its source is in the hills northeast of Verdun. It flows east and joins the Moselle near Mondelange, between Metz and Thionville.

Name
"Orne" may originate from autura (a river, cf. Eure), or onna (a river) as mentioned in Endlicher's glossary of Gallic names De nominibus Gallicis, in which these words are translated into Latin as flumen.

If so, then there is no relationship with the name of the Orne river in Normandy, which is referred to as the Olina by Ptolemy, a homonym of Fluvius Olne, the Orne saosnoise in Sarthe, which Xavier Delamarre traces back to the Celtic  olīnā (elbow).

Geography

The people of the Pays Orne-Moselle and Pays de l'Orne communes have formed an association for the creation of a riverside trail named "Fil Bleu" ("Blue Thread") or "Promenade des Berges de l'Orne" ("Promenade of the banks of the Orne"), which will extend the length of the riverbed.
Between Rombas/Clouange and Rosselange, it exists on both sides of the river.

Two of these footbridges are however no longer passable: the "passerelle de Moyeuvre Grande" (for which a detour via road bridge exists) and the "passerelle de la base nautique d'Homècourt".

The trail is frequently used by both pedestrians and cyclists, as well as by those on rollerblades. It crosses the communes of Rombas, Clouange, Rosselange, Moyeuvre Grande, Joeuf, Homècourt, Aubouè, Moineville and Valleroy.
Since 2011, the trail has been extended from its prior endpoint to the commune of Amnéville-les-Thermes. Between  of it have been built and are being maintained by the municipality of Rombas.

Tributaries
The Orne's principal tributaries and subtributaries are:

The Orne is also fed by water pumped out of the mines at Jarny, Giraumont, Auboué and Orne-Roncourt.

Hydrology
The Orne is a substantial river, similar to its neighbours in the West Lorraine region which rise in the Côtes de Meuse.

Flow rates of the Orne at Rosselange
The Orne's flow rate has been measured over a period of 40 years (1967–2007) at Rosselange, in the Moselle department a short way upstream of the confluence.

These monthly figures, however, are just averages, and conceal even more pronounced short-term variation.

Monthly average flow rate in m/s measured at Rosselange hydrological stationData taken over a 41-year period 

Flooding of the Orne can be very significant. These figures indicate that the flood of December 2003 was, roughly speaking, a 20-year event and thus not particularly unusual. The Orne's IMFRs are over half that of the Meurthe, the Moselle's most significant French tributary and whose basin is almost 2.5 time larger.

This is despite the Loing's watershed being three and a half times larger than the Orne.

The Orne is fed by heavy rainfall in the western part of its watershed. The runoff curve number in its watershed is  annually, which is almost equal to the average of all France, but clearly less than the average in the French part of the Moselle basin,  at Hauconcourt. The specific flow rate reaches 10.3 litres per second per square kilometre of watershed.

Flow rates of members of the Orne basin

See also
 List of rivers of France

References

External links 
 

Rivers of France
Rivers of Moselle (department)
Rivers of Meurthe-et-Moselle
Rivers of Grand Est